
Theiss may refer to:

Companies
Theiss Aviation, an American aircraft manufacturer
Konrad Theiss Verlag, a German book publishing company

People
 Brooke Theiss (born 1969), American actress
 Christine Theiss (born 1980), German female world champion in professional full contact kickboxing
 Mike Theiss (born 1978), American photographer
 William Ware Theiss (1930–1992), American costume designer
 Theiss., taxonomic author abbreviation of Ferdinand Theissen (1877–1919), German-Austrian mycologist

Places 
 Lake Theiss or Lake Tisza
 Theiss River or Tisza

See also
 
 Theis (disambiguation)
 Tisza (disambiguation)
 Thiess (disambiguation)
 Theissen (disambiguation)
 Thiessen (disambiguation)
 Tice (disambiguation)

Surnames from given names